

Codes

References

R